José María Flores Burlón (born February 10, 1955) is an Uruguayan former professional boxer. Flores Burlón had a total of 115 professional bouts. He challenged once for the WBC Cruiserweight title in 1988.

Boxing career

Early career
Flores Burlón began his professional boxing career on February 6, 1976, defeating Alejandro García by a six round decision in Pergamino, Argentina. His first fourteen bouts were in Pergamino, he had a record of 13 wins and 1 draw (tie) during that span, the draw coming on September 17 of that same year against Segundo Paiz, over ten rounds.

On January 27, 1977, Flores Burlón had his first fight outside Pergamino, when he outpointed Raul Antonio Paez over ten rounds in Arrecife, Argentina.

Eventually, Flores Burlón built a record of 27 wins, no losses and two draws, with ten knockouts, before he faced Pedro Cesar Duarte, on March 3, 1978 in San Luis, Argentina. Flores Burlón lost for the first time as a professional, when Duarte outpointed him over ten rounds.

Championship title
After three more victories and one loss, Flores Burlón fought for a title for the first time. His first championship bout also marked his debut in Uruguay. He beat Marcelo Quiñones on August 12, 1978 at Montevideo to win the South American Middleweight title, which had been vacant since Hugo Corro had defeated Rodrigo Valdéz for the world championship.

Flores Burlón lost the South American title in his first defense, being knocked out in round four by Ruben Pardo on January 12, 1979 in Mar del Plata, Argentina.

Flores Burlón then had some career ups and downs, winning 2, losing 2 and drawing 1 of his next five bouts. After losing on November 2 to Rogelio Zarza. After that fight, he began a twelve-fight win streak, when he beat Aldo Carmona by a knockout in eight rounds, on April 24, 1980. Among the twelve victories in that streak were a second round knockout over Zarza, a ten round decision win against Duarte, and a twelve round decision over Pardo on April 25, 1981 in Buenos Aires. His victory over Pardo made him South American Middleweight champion for the second time. On June 13 of that year, Flores Burlón met another well known Middleweight of the area, Juan Roldán. He lost to Roldán by a third round knockout.

Fame
Flores Burlón began another winning streak when he defeated Jorge Servin by a knockout in five rounds on August 8. He won 19 bouts in a row, including a third fight with Rogelio Zarza, and his United States debut, when he knocked Dornell Wigfall out in six rounds as part of the Michael Spinks vs. Dwight Muhammad Qawi fight's undercard on March 18, 1983 in Atlantic City, New Jersey. By then, Flores Burlón had changed division, becoming a world ranked light heavyweight. Flores Burlón became famous across Latin America, Ring En Español dedicating many articles to him.

Despite being defeated with a second round knockout by Cesar Abel Romero on July 30 of 1983, Flores Burlón was named South American Light Heavyweight champion. He lost that title on his first defense, being knocked out in round one by Juan Carlos Gimenez Ferreyra, on November 13, in Asunción, Paraguay. Almost one year later, on November 10, 1984, he recovered the South American Light Heavyweight title, defeating Victor Robledo by a twelve round decision in Buenos Aires.

World Championship try
On May 25, 1986, Flores Burlón conquered his third regional belt when he won the South American Cruiserweight title by knocking Hector Pedro Rohr out in the fourth round, at the Argentine city of Necochea. On August 8, he outpointed former world champion Marvin Camel in ten rounds, once again in Buenos Aires. After this win, Flores Burlón was ranked number one among Cruiserweight challengers in the world.

On January 22, 1988, Flores Burlón had his first world title try. Attempting to become Uruguay's first world boxing champion in history, he lost a twelve round unanimous decision to Puerto Rican Carlos de León, the World Boxing Council's champion, in Atlantic City. This would turn out to be the only world championship fight Flores Burlón ever had.

Flores Burlón boxed for twelve more years, winning the WBA's Fedelatin (Latin American) and WBC's mundo Hispano (Hispanic world)'s Light Cruiserweight titles. He retired after beating Reginaldo Dos Santos by a knockout in round six on September 9, 2000, to retain his mundo Latino belt.

Overall career
Flores Burlón had 96 wins, 11 losses and 8 draws, with 47 knockout wins. He is a resident of Pergamino, Argentina, where he held many of his early professional bouts.

Professional boxing record

|-
|align="center" colspan=8|96 Wins (47 knockouts, 49 decisions), 11 Losses (6 knockouts, 5 decisions), 8 Draws
|-
| align="center" style="border-style: none none solid solid; background: #e3e3e3"|Result
| align="center" style="border-style: none none solid solid; background: #e3e3e3"|Record
| align="center" style="border-style: none none solid solid; background: #e3e3e3"|Opponent
| align="center" style="border-style: none none solid solid; background: #e3e3e3"|Type
| align="center" style="border-style: none none solid solid; background: #e3e3e3"|Round
| align="center" style="border-style: none none solid solid; background: #e3e3e3"|Date
| align="center" style="border-style: none none solid solid; background: #e3e3e3"|Location
| align="center" style="border-style: none none solid solid; background: #e3e3e3"|Notes
|-align=center
|Win
|
|align=left| Edson Cesar Antonio
|RTD
|7
|29/09/2000
|align=left| Pergamino, Argentina
|align=left|
|-
|Win
|
|align=left| Raul Esteban Barreto
|UD
|10
|04/08/2000
|align=left| Pergamino, Argentina
|align=left|
|-
|Win
|
|align=left| Aaron Orlando Soria
|UD
|12
|16/06/2000
|align=left| Pergamino, Argentina
|align=left|
|-
|Win
|
|align=left| Argemiro Antonio dos Santos
|KO
|2
|05/05/2000
|align=left| Pergamino, Argentina
|align=left|
|-
|Draw
|
|align=left| Edson Cesar Antonio
|PTS
|8
|24/03/2000
|align=left| Pergamino, Argentina
|align=left|
|-
|Win
|
|align=left| Julio Abel Gonzalez
|UD
|8
|18/02/2000
|align=left| Pergamino, Argentina
|align=left|
|-
|Win
|
|align=left| Jonatas dos Santos
|TKO
|6
|21/08/1999
|align=left| Montevideo, Uruguay
|align=left|
|-
|Win
|
|align=left| Juan Hipolito Helmann Rivas
|KO
|1
|19/06/1999
|align=left| Montevideo, Uruguay
|align=left|
|-
|Loss
|
|align=left| Mike Hunter
|TKO
|1
|31/10/1990
|align=left| Melbourne, Australia
|align=left|
|-
|Win
|
|align=left| Jaime Manque
|KO
|6
|03/08/1990
|align=left| Pergamino, Argentina
|align=left|
|-
|Win
|
|align=left| Emmanuel Brites Camargo
|TKO
|7
|04/11/1989
|align=left| Montevideo, Uruguay
|align=left|
|-
|Win
|
|align=left| Victor Robledo
|UD
|12
|16/06/1989
|align=left| Paysandú, Uruguay
|align=left|
|-
|Win
|
|align=left| Raul Venturelli
|KO
|6
|19/05/1989
|align=left| Paysandú, Uruguay
|align=left|
|-
|Win
|
|align=left| Walter Daniel Bustos
|KO
|1
|14/04/1989
|align=left| Pergamino, Argentina
|align=left|
|-
|Loss
|
|align=left| Carlos de León
|UD
|12
|22/01/1988
|align=left| Atlantic City, New Jersey, U.S.
|align=left|
|-
|Win
|
|align=left| Eduardo Domingo Contreras
|PTS
|10
|18/09/1987
|align=left| Pergamino, Argentina
|align=left|
|-
|Win
|
|align=left| Alberto Adolfo Ubelart
|PTS
|10
|14/08/1987
|align=left| Pergamino, Argentina
|align=left|
|-
|Win
|
|align=left| Juan Carlos Rodríguez
|PTS
|10
|10/07/1987
|align=left| Montevideo, Uruguay
|align=left|
|-
|Draw
|
|align=left| Juan Carlos Fernández
|PTS
|10
|06/02/1987
|align=left| Paraná, Argentina
|align=left|
|-
|Win
|
|align=left| Jimmy Bills
|PTS
|10
|22/11/1986
|align=left| Pergamino, Argentina
|align=left|
|-
|Win
|
|align=left| Marvin Camel
|UD
|10
|08/08/1986
|align=left| Pergamino, Argentina
|align=left|
|-
|Win
|
|align=left| Hector Pedro Rohr
|KO
|4
|25/05/1986
|align=left| Necochea, Argentina
|align=left|
|-
|Win
|
|align=left| Hilario Rufino
|KO
|3
|18/04/1986
|align=left| Pergamino, Argentina
|align=left|
|-
|Win
|
|align=left| Hector Pedro Rohr
|PTS
|10
|21/12/1985
|align=left| Pergamino, Argentina
|align=left|
|-
|Win
|
|align=left| Hector Pedro Rohr
|PTS
|10
|20/12/1985
|align=left| Pergamino, Argentina
|align=left|
|-
|Win
|
|align=left| Pedro Cichero
|TKO
|7
|23/11/1985
|align=left| Pergamino, Argentina
|align=left|
|-
|Win
|
|align=left| Roberto Carlos Cardozo
|TKO
|5
|27/09/1985
|align=left| Rosario, Argentina
|align=left|
|-
|Win
|
|align=left| Clarismundo Aparecido Silva
|TKO
|5
|24/08/1985
|align=left| Pergamino, Argentina
|align=left|
|-
|Win
|
|align=left| Juan Carlos Rodríguez
|PTS
|10
|21/07/1985
|align=left| Villa Ángela, Argentina
|align=left|
|-
|Win
|
|align=left| Juan Jose Leiva
|RTD
|7
|17/05/1985
|align=left| Daireaux, Argentina
|align=left|
|-
|Win
|
|align=left| Victor Robledo
|PTS
|12
|10/11/1984
|align=left| Buenos Aires, Argentina
|align=left|
|-
|Draw
|
|align=left| Angel Antonio Caro
|PTS
|10
|07/09/1984
|align=left| Mar del Plata,Argentina
|align=left|
|-
|Loss
|
|align=left| Jorge Juan Salgado
|PTS
|10
|16/08/1984
|align=left| Mendoza, Argentina
|align=left|
|-
|Win
|
|align=left| Andres Fidel Olmedo
|PTS
|10
|16/03/1984
|align=left| Paraná, Argentina
|align=left|
|-
|Loss
|
|align=left| Juan Carlos Gimenez
|KO
|1
|13/11/1983
|align=left| Asunción, Paraguay
|align=left|
|-
|Win
|
|align=left| Andres Fidel Olmedo
|KO
|6
|06/10/1983
|align=left| Asunción, Paraguay
|align=left|
|-
|Win
|
|align=left| Irineo Claudio Cabrera
|KO
|2
|17/09/1983
|align=left| Pergamino, Argentina
|align=left|
|-
|Loss
|
|align=left| Cesar Abel Romero
|KO
|2
|30/07/1983
|align=left| Buenos Aires, Argentina
|align=left|
|-
|Win
|
|align=left| Juan Carlos Rodríguez
|KO
|7
|01/07/1983
|align=left| Pergamino, Argentina
|align=left|
|-
|Win
|
|align=left| Aldo Carmona
|TKO
|2
|21/05/1983
|align=left| General Pico, Argentina
|align=left|
|-
|Win
|
|align=left|Ruben Paredes
|KO
|1
|06/05/1983
|align=left| Rojas, Argentina
|align=left|
|-
|Win
|
|align=left| Obdulio Rogelio Zarza
|TKO
|5
|13/04/1983
|align=left| Montevideo, Uruguay
|align=left|
|-
|Win
|
|align=left| Dornell Wigfall
|KO
|6
|18/03/1983
|align=left| Atlantic City, New Jersey, U.S.
|align=left|
|-
|Win
|
|align=left| Aldo Carmona
|PTS
|10
|23/12/1982
|align=left| Pergamino, Argentina
|align=left|
|-
|Win
|
|align=left| Ricardo Molina Ortiz
|PTS
|10
|08/10/1982
|align=left| Montevideo, Uruguay
|align=left|
|-
|Win
|
|align=left| Chris Wells
|TKO
|8
|06/08/1982
|align=left| Montevideo, Uruguay
|align=left|
|-
|Win
|
|align=left| Norberto Rufino Cabrera
|TKO
|9
|26/06/1982
|align=left| Pergamino, Argentina
|align=left|
|-
|Win
|
|align=left| Jose Alberto Vega
|TKO
|2
|24/05/1982
|align=left| Pergamino, Argentina
|align=left|
|-
|Win
|
|align=left| Alfredo Morales
|KO
|2
|07/05/1982
|align=left| San Nicolás de los Arroyos, Argentina
|align=left|
|-
|Win
|
|align=left| Abel Celestino Bailone
|PTS
|10
|10/04/1982
|align=left| Buenos Aires, Argentina
|align=left|
|-
|Win
|
|align=left| Jesus Eugenio Ibanez
|TKO
|8
|12/03/1982
|align=left| Pergamino, Argentina
|align=left|
|-
|Win
|
|align=left| Angel Gustavo Salinas
|PTS
|10
|20/02/1982
|align=left| Buenos Aires, Argentina
|align=left|
|-
|Win
|
|align=left| Angel Gustavo Salinas
|PTS
|10
|18/12/1981
|align=left| Montevideo, Uruguay
|align=left|
|-
|Win
|
|align=left| Norberto Rufino Cabrera
|PTS
|10
|20/11/1981
|align=left| Montevideo, Uruguay
|align=left|
|-
|Win
|
|align=left| Juan Carlos Fernández
|KO
|6
|06/11/1981
|align=left| Pergamino, Argentina
|align=left|
|-
|Win
|
|align=left| Jesus Eugenio Ibanez
|PTS
|10
|04/09/1981
|align=left| Montevideo, Uruguay
|align=left|
|-
|Win
|
|align=left| Jorge Servin
|TKO
|5
|08/08/1981
|align=left| San Miguel, Argentina
|align=left|
|-
|Loss
|
|align=left| Juan Roldán
|TKO
|3
|13/06/1981
|align=left| Buenos Aires, Argentina
|align=left|
|-
|Win
|
|align=left| Juan Alberto Ibanez
|PTS
|10
|29/05/1981
|align=left| San Miguel de Tucumán, Argentina
|align=left|
|-
|Win
|
|align=left| Natalio Ibarra
|KO
|6
|15/05/1981
|align=left| Pergamino, Argentina
|align=left|
|-
|Win
|
|align=left| Ruben Hector Pardo
|PTS
|12
|25/04/1981
|align=left| Buenos Aires, Argentina
|align=left|
|-
|Win
|
|align=left| Jose Luis Duran
|TKO
|9
|24/04/1981
|align=left| Pergamino, Argentina
|align=left|
|-
|Win
|
|align=left| Pedro Cesar Duarte
|PTS
|10
|13/03/1981
|align=left| San Miguel de Tucumán, Argentina
|align=left|
|-
|Win
|
|align=left| Obdulio Rogelio Zarza
|PTS
|10
|19/12/1980
|align=left| Tapiales, Argentina
|align=left|
|-
|Win
|
|align=left| Manuel Flores
|TKO
|2
|10/10/1980
|align=left| Pergamino, Argentina
|align=left|
|-
|Win
|
|align=left| Hugo Belisario Salega
|RTD
|3
|12/09/1980
|align=left| San Miguel, Argentina
|align=left|
|-
|Win
|
|align=left| Crispin de Oliveira
|TKO
|6
|14/06/1980
|align=left| Pergamino, Argentina
|align=left|
|-
|Win
|
|align=left| Obdulio Rogelio Zarza
|PTS
|10
|24/05/1980
|align=left| Concordia, Argentina
|align=left|
|-
|Win
|
|align=left| Roberto Troilo Ortiz
|KO
|2
|10/05/1980
|align=left| Los Toldos, Argentina
|align=left|
|-
|Win
|
|align=left| Aldo Carmona
|RTD
|8
|24/04/1980
|align=left| Pergamino, Argentina
|align=left|
|-
|Loss
|
|align=left| Obdulio Rogelio Zarza
|TKO
|9
|02/11/1979
|align=left| Concordia, Argentina
|align=left|
|-
|Win
|
|align=left| Alberto Juan Almiron
|PTS
|10
|05/10/1979
|align=left| San Miguel, Argentina
|align=left|
|-
|Win
|
|align=left| Antonio Lopez
|RTD
|10
|31/08/1979
|align=left| Rosario, Argentina
|align=left|
|-
|Draw
|
|align=left| Obdulio Rogelio Zarza
|PTS
|10
|10/08/1979
|align=left| Salta, Argentina
|align=left|
|-
|Loss
|
|align=left| Jose Alberto Vega
|PTS
|10
|13/07/1979
|align=left| Rosario, Argentina
|align=left|
|-
|Loss
|
|align=left| Ruben Hector Pardo
|TKO
|4
|12/01/1979
|align=left| Mar del Plata, Argentina
|align=left|
|-
|Draw
|
|align=left| Hugo Estefano Obregon
|PTS
|10
|25/11/1978
|align=left| Olavarría, Argentina
|align=left|
|-
|Win
|
|align=left| Oscar Aguero
|KO
|8
|13/10/1978
|align=left| Azul, Argentina
|align=left|
|-
|Win
|
|align=left| Alberto Juan Almiron
|PTS
|10
|23/09/1978
|align=left| Salta, Argentina
|align=left|
|-
|Draw
|
|align=left| Jose Alberto Vega
|PTS
|10
|08/09/1978
|align=left| Pergamino, Argentina
|align=left|
|-
|Win
|
|align=left| Marcelo Quiñones
|PTS
|12
|12/08/1978
|align=left| Montevideo, Uruguay
|align=left|
|-
|Win
|
|align=left| Roque Ignacio Roldan
|PTS
|10
|07/07/1978
|align=left| Pergamino, Argentina
|align=left|
|-
|Win
|
|align=left| Ruben Hector Pardo
|PTS
|10
|27/05/1978
|align=left| Buenos Aires, Argentina
|align=left|
|-
|Win
|
|align=left| Alberto Juan Almiron
|TD
|7
|05/05/1978
|align=left| Pergamino, Argentina
|align=left|
|-
|Loss
|
|align=left| Ricardo Arce
|PTS
|10
|06/04/1978
|align=left| Posadas, Argentina
|align=left|
|-
|Loss
|
|align=left| Pedro Cesar Duarte
|PTS
|10
|03/03/1978
|align=left| San Luis, Córdoba, Argentina
|align=left|
|-
|Win
|
|align=left| Obdulio Rogelio Zarza
|PTS
|10
|30/01/1978
|align=left| Azul, Argentina
|align=left|
|-
|Win
|
|align=left| Pedro Cesar Duarte
|PTS
|10
|23/12/1977
|align=left| Pergamino, Argentina
|align=left|
|-
|Win
|
|align=left| Roque Ignacio Roldan
|PTS
|10
|11/11/1977
|align=left| Pergamino, Argentina
|align=left|
|-
|Win
|
|align=left| Alberto Juan Almiron
|PTS
|10
|22/10/1977
|align=left| Buenos Aires, Argentina
|align=left|
|-
|Win
|
|align=left| Pedro Cesar Duarte
|KO
|10
|01/10/1977
|align=left| Buenos Aires, Argentina
|align=left|
|-
|Win
|
|align=left| Antonio Lopez
|TKO
|8
|16/09/1977
|align=left| Pergamino, Argentina
|align=left|
|-
|Win
|
|align=left| Rodolfo Rosales
|PTS
|10
|29/08/1977
|align=left| Buenos Aires, Argentina
|align=left|
|-
|Win
|
|align=left| Camilo Gaitan
|PTS
|10
|05/08/1977
|align=left| Pergamino, Argentina
|align=left|
|-
|Win
|
|align=left| Hugo Estefano Obregon
|PTS
|10
|09/07/1977
|align=left| Pergamino, Argentina
|align=left|
|-
|Win
|
|align=left| Ramón Méndez
|PTS
|10
|03/06/1977
|align=left| Pergamino, Argentina
|align=left|
|-
|Win
|
|align=left| Hugo Inocencio Saavedra
|TKO
|2
|20/05/1977
|align=left| Córdoba, Argentina
|align=left|
|-
|Draw
|
|align=left| Camilo Gaitan
|PTS
|10
|07/05/1977
|align=left| Pergamino, Argentina
|align=left|
|-
|Win
|
|align=left| Esteban Alfredo Osuna
|PTS
|10
|09/04/1977
|align=left| Pergamino, Argentina
|align=left|
|-
|Win
|
|align=left| Raul Antonio Paez
|RTD
|4
|10/03/1977
|align=left| Pergamino, Argentina
|align=left|
|-
|Win
|
|align=left| Raul Antonio Paez
|PTS
|10
|27/01/1977
|align=left| Arrecifes, Argentina
|align=left|
|-
|Win
|
|align=left| Juan Carlos Artaza
|PTS
|10
|17/12/1976
|align=left| Pergamino, Argentina
|align=left|
|-
|Win
|
|align=left| Hugo Estefano Obregon
|PTS
|10
|25/11/1976
|align=left| Pergamino, Argentina
|align=left|
|-
|Win
|
|align=left| Segundo Miguel Pais
|KO
|6
|05/11/1976
|align=left| Pergamino, Argentina
|align=left|
|-
|Draw
|
|align=left| Segundo Miguel Pais
|PTS
|10
|17/09/1976
|align=left| Pergamino, Argentina
|align=left|
|-
|Win
|
|align=left| Hugo Estefano Obregon
|PTS
|10
|03/09/1976
|align=left| Pergamino, Argentina
|align=left|
|-
|Win
|
|align=left| Alberto Juan Almiron
|PTS
|10
|07/08/1976
|align=left| Pergamino, Argentina
|align=left|
|-
|Win
|
|align=left| Juan Jose Santos Paz
|TKO
|8
|16/07/1976
|align=left| Pergamino, Argentina
|align=left|
|-
|Win
|
|align=left| José Pintos
|KO
|3
|18/06/1976
|align=left| Pergamino, Argentina
|align=left|
|-
|Win
|
|align=left| Octavio Escaurriza
|PTS
|8
|04/06/1976
|align=left| Pergamino, Argentina
|align=left|
|-
|Win
|
|align=left| Victor Pereyra
|TKO
|3
|24/05/1976
|align=left| Pergamino, Argentina
|align=left|
|-
|Win
|
|align=left| Hector Rodolfo Altamirano
|PTS
|8
|30/04/1976
|align=left| Pergamino, Argentina
|align=left|
|-
|Win
|
|align=left| Gregorio Navarro
|KO
|3
|12/03/1976
|align=left| Pergamino, Argentina
|align=left|
|-
|Win
|
|align=left| Celso Laudino Sosa
|TKO
|3
|20/02/1976
|align=left| Pergamino, Argentina
|align=left|
|-
|Win
|
|align=left| Alejandro García
|PTS
|6
|06/02/1976
|align=left| Pergamino, Argentina
|align=left|
|}

References

External links
 

1955 births
Living people
Cruiserweight boxers
Light-heavyweight boxers
Middleweight boxers
Sportspeople from Montevideo
Uruguayan male boxers